Kai Samra is a stand-up comedian from Handsworth, Birmingham. His comedy dissects life as a young, working class, British Asian.

Career 
Samra took his critically acclaimed debut hour show, Underclass, to Edinburgh Fringe in 2019 with Soho Theatre. Underclass was filmed for Amazon Prime Video in 2021. The show covers Samra’s time at homeless shelter Centrepoint and a Vice interview Samra did with former leader of the EDL Tommy Robinson.

Samra took his second show, Native, with Soho Theatre to the Edinburgh Fringe in 2022.

Samra has appeared on series 1 and 3 of ITV2’s Stand-up sketch show. Samra wrote and performed his own episode on the on BBC3 series Quickies. Samra has written and performed on Now Show on BBC Radio 4. In 2022, Samra was a writer for Romesh Ranganathan’s The Ranganation. Samra was a judge for the BBC New Comedy Awards 2022.

References

External links 

Comedians from Birmingham, West Midlands

Year of birth missing (living people)
Living people